The 2002–03 Heineken Cup was the eighth edition of the Heineken Cup. Competing teams from France, Ireland, Italy, Wales, England and Scotland, were divided into six pools of four, in which teams played home and away matches against each other. The pool winners and two best runners-up qualified for the knock-out stages.

Teams

Pool stage

In the pool matches teams received 
2 points for a win 
1 points for a draw

Pool 1

Pool 2

Pool 3

Pool 4

Pool 5

Pool 6

Seeding

Knockout stage

Quarter-finals

Semi-finals

Final

Toulouse became the second team to win the competition more than once.

References

 
Heineken Cup seasons
Heineken